Subero is a surname. Notable people with the surname include:

Alfonso Subero (born 1970), Spanish footballer
Carlos Subero (born 1972), Venezuelan baseball coach and player
Cristhian Subero (born 1991), Colombian footballer